Miguel Ekua Iala Mangue (born 21 November 1999), known as Jimmi Ekua, is an Equatorial Guinean footballer who plays as a midfielder for Spanish Tercera Federación club Rápido de Bouzas and the Equatorial Guinea national team.

Early life
Ekua was born in Equatorial Guinea and raised in Las Palmas de Gran Canaria, Spain, where he moved being too young. Subsequently, he became a naturalized citizen of Spain.

Club career
Ekua is a product of AD Huracán in his hometown. He left good impressions during that time, managing to move to the Inter Milan Youth Sector in Italy. He completed his youth formation back in Las Palmas de Gran Canaria for UD Las Palmas and CEF Puertos Las Palmas. He has developed his senior career in Portugal, for UD Oliveirense, AD Marco 09, SC Espinho and Rabo do Peixe.

International career
Ekua was selected to represent the Canary Islands youth team in late February 2017.

In August 2021, Ekua received maiden call-up to Equatorial Guinea national team for FIFA World Cup qualification matches against Tunisia and Mauritania.

Career statistics

International

Personal life
Ekua's younger brother, José Nneme, is also a footballer and plays for Austrian club ATSV Stadl-Paura.

References

External links

1999 births
Living people
Fang people
Equatoguinean footballers
Association football midfielders
Inter Milan players
U.D. Oliveirense players
S.C. Espinho players
Campeonato de Portugal (league) players
Equatorial Guinea international footballers
Equatoguinean expatriate footballers
Equatoguinean expatriate sportspeople in Italy
Expatriate footballers in Italy
Equatoguinean expatriate sportspeople in Portugal
Expatriate footballers in Portugal
Equatoguinean emigrants to Spain
Naturalised citizens of Spain
Footballers from Las Palmas
Spanish footballers
UD Las Palmas players
Spanish sportspeople of Equatoguinean descent